Isaiah Burse (born December 8, 1991) is a former American football wide receiver. He played college football at Fresno State. He was signed by the Denver Broncos as an undrafted free agent in 2014.

High school career
From 2007 to 2009, Burse played for Modesto Christian High School in Modesto, California. He was the starting varsity quarterback for three seasons, and during his senior year, led the Modesto Christian Crusaders to the small school state championship. They defeated Parker, a San Diego high school, 44-40. The Crusaders finished the season with a perfect 15-0 record. Burse finished the season with 27 passing touchdowns, 26 rushing touchdowns, and was named MaxPreps Small School State Player of the Year. He was ranked a two star recruit by ESPN, and committed to play wide receiver at Fresno State.

College career
Burse played college football at Fresno State University from 2010 to 2013. He finished his career with 210 receptions for 2,503 yards and 15 touchdowns.

Professional career

Denver Broncos
Burse was signed by the Denver Broncos after going undrafted in the 2014 NFL Draft. On December 6, 2014, the Broncos released him. On December 8, 2014, the Broncos re-signed Burse to their practice squad. On January 12, 2015, he signed a futures contract with the Chargers. He was waived on September 5, 2015.

Pittsburgh Steelers
On September 7, 2015, Burse was signed to the Steelers' practice squad. He was released by the Steelers on September 24, 2015.

San Diego / Los Angeles Chargers
On November 4, 2015, Burse was signed to the Chargers' practice squad. On January 4, 2016, he signed a futures contract with the Chargers. On September 20, 2016, he was released by the Chargers. Two days later he was signed to the practice squad. He was promoted to the active roster on October 29, 2016. He was released by the Chargers on October 31, 2016 and was signed to the practice squad two days later. He was promoted back to the active roster on November 5, 2016.

On September 2, 2017, Burse was waived/injured by the Chargers and placed on injured reserve.

San Diego Fleet
Burse signed with the San Diego Fleet of the Alliance of American Football for the inaugural 2019 season. He was waived/injured on January 10, 2019 during training camp, and was subsequently placed on injured reserve after clearing waivers. The league ceased operations in April 2019.

Hamilton Tiger-Cats
Burse signed with the Hamilton Tiger-Cats of the Canadian Football League on January 30, 2020. He was released on June 10, 2021.

References

External links
Denver Broncos bio
Fresno State Bulldogs bio

1991 births
Living people
Sportspeople from Modesto, California
Players of American football from California
American football wide receivers
American football return specialists
Fresno State Bulldogs football players
Denver Broncos players
Pittsburgh Steelers players
San Diego Chargers players
Los Angeles Chargers players
San Diego Fleet players
Hamilton Tiger-Cats players
Modesto Christian School alumni